Alice Adams may refer to:
Alice Adams (novel), a 1921 Pulitzer Prize–winning novel by Booth Tarkington
Alice Adams (1923 film), a 1923 film based on the novel by Booth Tarkington
Alice Adams (1935 film), a 1935 film based on the novel by Booth Tarkington
Alice Adams (writer) (1926–1999), American novelist and writer from Fredericksburg, Virginia
Alice Adams (artist) (born 1930), American artist

Adams, Alice